CKLF like MARVEL transmembrane domain-containing 4 (i.e. CMTM4), formerly termed chemokine-like factor superfamily 4 (i.e. CKLFSF4), is a small transmembrane protein which passes the plasma membrane four times. It has 3 known isoforms, the CMTM4-v1 to CMTM4-v3 proteins. Protein isoforms are variant products that are made by alternative splicing of a single gene. The gene for the CMTM4 isoforms is located in band 22 on the long (i.e. "q") arm of chromosome 16. The CMTM4 gene and its 3 isoform proteins belong to the CKLF-like MARVEL transmembrane domain-containing family of structurally and functionally related genes and proteins. CMTM4-v1 and CMTM4-v2 are widely expressed in multiple human tissue while CMTM4-v3 has been detected only in the kidney and placental tissues.

The Cancer Genome Atlas indicates that CMTM4 protein is frequently reduced in colorectal cancer and its high expression is associated with increased overall survival rates in individuals with this cancer. CMTM4 protein was also found to be greatly reduced in the tissues of clear cell renal cell carcinoma compared to nearby normal renal (i.e. kidney) tissues and the forced overexpression of this protein in 786-O cells (a renal cancer cell line) inhibited their growth in culture as well as in a xenograph nude mouse model. Finally, CMTM4 protein levels were lower in several brain cancers, such as glioblastomas, neuroblastomas, and medulloblastomas, compared to their levels in nearby normal, non-tumorous brain tissues. These studies suggest CMTM4 may act to suppress these malignancies. Further studies are needed to confirm these relationships and determine if CMTM4 protein can be used as a marker for the severity of these malignancies and/or serve as a therapeutic target for treating them.

CMTM4 in IL-17A signaling 
Recently, CMTM4 has been identified to play a critical role in IL-17A signaling. The IL-17 receptor consists of two subunits: IL-17 receptor subunit A and C (IL-17RA, IL-17RC). CMTM4 was reported to be associated with the transmembrane domain of IL-17RC. This association proved to be critical for IL-17 signaling as CMTM4 knockout cells were unresponsive to IL-17A stimulation. Interestingly, lack of CMTM4 in cells caused an overall decrease in IL-17RC surface expression and impaired IL-17RC glycosylation. Altogether, CMTM4 regulates IL-17RC glycosylation status and its cellular localization.

References 

Human proteins